The 2016 Utah Senate election was held on November 8, 2016. Fifteen Senate seats were up for election. Prior to the election, the Republicans held a majority.

Overview

Results
The election took place on November 8, 2016. Candidate list and results from the Lieutenant Governor of Utah.

See also
Utah Senate
Utah Legislature
Utah elections, 2016

References

Senate
Utah State Senate elections
Utah Senate